Adamjee may refer to:

 Adamjee Cantonment College
 Adamjee Group of Companies
 Adamjee Haji Dawood